Teleogryllus is a genus of crickets in the family Gryllidae.  Species can be found in Africa, Asia, Australia and the Pacific islands.

Species
The following are listed in Orthoptera Species File Online:
subgenus Afroteleogryllus Gorochov, 1988
Teleogryllus clarus Gorochov, 1988
Teleogryllus latifrons (Karsch, 1893)
Teleogryllus lemur Gorochov, 1990
Teleogryllus leucostomus (Serville, 1838)
Teleogryllus trivialis Gorochov, 1990
subgenus Brachyteleogryllus Gorochov, 1988
Teleogryllus boninensis Matsuura, 1984
Teleogryllus commodus (Walker, 1869)
Teleogryllus emma (Ohmachi & Matsuura, 1951)
Teleogryllus infernalis (Saussure, 1877)[synonym T. yezoemma (Ohmachi & Matsuura, 1951)]
Teleogryllus occipitalis (Serville, 1838)
Teleogryllus rohinae Jaiswara & Jain, 2021
subgenus Cryncoides Gorochov, 1988
Teleogryllus longelytrum (Gorochov, 1988)
subgenus Macroteleogryllus Gorochov, 1985
Teleogryllus derelictus Gorochov, 1985
Teleogryllus mitratus (Burmeister, 1838)[synonyms include T. testaceus (Walker, 1869)]
subgenus Teleogryllus Chopard, 1961
Teleogryllus adustus (Karsch, 1893)
Teleogryllus afer (Saussure, 1877)
Teleogryllus africanus Otte & Cade, 1983
Teleogryllus albipalpus He, 2018
Teleogryllus angolensis (Chopard, 1962)
Teleogryllus bicoloripes Chopard, 1961
Teleogryllus brachypterus Chopard, 1967
Teleogryllus burri (Chopard, 1962)
Teleogryllus fallaciosus (Shiraki, 1930)
Teleogryllus flavovittatus (Chopard, 1928)
Teleogryllus fletcheri (Chopard, 1935)
Teleogryllus gnu Otte & Cade, 1983
Teleogryllus gracilipes (Saussure, 1877)
Teleogryllus gravelyi (Chopard, 1928)
Teleogryllus griaulei Chopard, 1961
Teleogryllus grumeti Otte & Cade, 1983
Teleogryllus himalayanus (Chopard, 1928)
Teleogryllus leo Otte & Cade, 1983
Teleogryllus leucostomoides (Chopard, 1962)
Teleogryllus longipennis (Saussure, 1877)
Teleogryllus macrurus (Walker, 1869)
Teleogryllus marabu Otte & Cade, 1983
Teleogryllus marini Otte & Alexander, 1983
Teleogryllus meru Otte & Cade, 1983
Teleogryllus mosetse Otte, Toms & Cade, 1988
Teleogryllus natalensis Otte & Cade, 1983
Teleogryllus nigripennis (Chopard, 1948)
Teleogryllus oceanicus (Le Guillou, 1841)
Teleogryllus posticus (Walker, 1869) - type species (as Gryllus posticus Walker)
Teleogryllus pulchriceps (Gerstaecker, 1869)
Teleogryllus rajasthanicus Meena & Swaminathan, 2022
Teleogryllus siamensis Inagaki & Matsuura, 1985
Teleogryllus soror (Chopard, 1940)
Teleogryllus triangulifer Chopard, 1961
Teleogryllus validus (Chopard, 1969)
Teleogryllus wernerianus (Karny, 1907)
Teleogryllus wittei (Chopard, 1939)
Teleogryllus xanthoneuroides (Chopard, 1932)
Teleogryllus xanthoneurus (Gerstaecker, 1869)
Teleogryllus zululandicus Otte & Cade, 1983

References

External links

Gryllinae
Orthoptera genera
Taxa named by Lucien Chopard